Jaret Ray Reddick is an American musician, singer, songwriter, composer, podcaster and actor, best known as the lead vocalist, guitarist, and primary songwriter of the rock band Bowling for Soup. As a voice actor, Reddick is known for his work on Phineas and Ferb, and he is also the current voice of Chuck E. Cheese.

Early life

Jaret Ray Reddick is the youngest of six children, with four sisters and a brother. He went to Cunningham Elementary School, Wichita Falls, Texas. He graduated from S. H. Rider High School in Wichita Falls. In high school, he played snare drum in the marching band, until age seventeen when he started playing guitar.

Reddick has owned a chain of toy stores  while attempting to get his music career off the ground. He resides in Prosper, Texas. One of the employees at his toy stores was a Japanese mizu shotokan karate expert and noticed Reddick's natural agility and poise during a company outing to a local pool. He taught Reddick the basics of mizu shotokan karate. Reddick since has continued his studies in mizu karate and is currently ranked as a fifth degree shibō no o shiri in the art. He is a fan of British heavy metal band Iron Maiden, and his favorite song by the band is "Paschendale", inspired by his old history teacher Dave McGill.

Career

Bowling for Soup

Bowling for Soup formed in 1994 in Wichita Falls, Texas. Their name derives from Bowling For Dollars, a comedy routine by Steve Martin. Reddick is the songwriter for the band, penning such BFS hits as "Punk Rock 101", as well as playing guitar. 

His primary guitar is a Music Man Axis that has a Miller Lite design on it; his former primary guitar until 2018 was similarly a Music Man Axis with a flag of Texas design on it.

Phineas and Ferb
Reddick's biggest project outside of Bowling for Soup is song writing and appearing as the lead singer of the fictional band Love Händel on the television show Phineas and Ferb. It started with Bowling for Soup providing the series' theme song "Today is Gonna Be a Great Day," (nominated for Outstanding Original Main Title Theme Music Emmy in 2008) and later Reddick's character Danny was introduced in the episode "Dude, We're Getting the Band Back Together". Reddick has since written several songs for the show and made a handful of appearances, both as Danny from Love Händel, and once with cartoon versions of the other members of Bowling for Soup performing "Today is Gonna Be a Great Day." In a 2021 podcast interview, Reddick revealed that he almost missed his Phineas and Ferb audition due to being hungover on an episode of The Road Trip Playlists podcast.

Sonic Unleashed
Reddick also worked with SEGA for the song "Endless Possibility", which is featured as the theme to the Sonic the Hedgehog videogame, Sonic Unleashed. The song was written by longtime Sonic game composer, Tomoya Ohtani.

Jarinus
Jarinus is a songwriting/production team composed of Reddick and Linus of Hollywood. The two have worked together co-writing songs for and co-producing the Bowling for Soup albums, Sorry for Partyin' (2009) and Fishin' for Woos (2011), as well as co-founding Crappy Records, and co-producing the People on Vacation EP The Carry_On EP (2011). In late 2011, Jarinus announced that they would be making their debut album and that they would be seeking funding for recording it through Kickstarter, and have since reached their goal of over $18,000. The duo began releasing demo recordings as free downloads, as a "song of the week" promotion, on SoundCloud. However, Reddick later stated these songs would not appear on the album.

Crappy Records
Crappy Records is an independent record label started by Reddick and Linus of Hollywood as a partnership with Oglio Records. The label has released albums from Kurt Baker, The Leftovers, Linus of Hollywood, MC Lars, and Skyfox.

Built By Ninjas
Built By Ninjas is a music video production group formed by Reddick and Heath Balderston. The group has produced music videos for MC Lars, Patent Pending, Palmdale, and Skyfox, as well as Bowling for Soup's music video for the song "Turbulence" and People on Vacation's video for the song "Where Do We Go."

Producing Darlington singles
In 2008, Reddick produced, co-wrote, and co-arranged two singles with solo artist Christy Darlington. SUV & Girls + Summer = Fun! were subsequently recorded at Valve Studios with Reddick producing. Reddick also sung backing vocals and performed guitar parts on the songs, with Christy performing lead vocal parts and guitar parts as well. Erik Chandler performed the bass parts and also backing vocals, and Gary Wiseman performed the drum parts. These two singles would later be released digitally. This collaboration was a result of Reddick & Bowling for Soup having known Darlington & performed concerts together in Dallas in the late 1990s, and a mutual liking and respect for each other's music.

People on Vacation

In 2010, Reddick started a side project band, called People on Vacation, with Ryan Hamilton from the indie rock band Smile Smile. The duo have since released two songs online. The first, "Better Off Dead" was released in late 2010, and a second, "She Was the Only One" was released in early 2011. A video for "Better Off Dead" has also been released. The duo released their debut EP The Carry On EP on November 24, 2011, through Brando Records.

Chuck E. Cheese 
In 2012, Chuck E. Cheese chose Reddick to be the new voice of their mascot, as part of a revamp for the character. He replaces Duncan Brannan in the role.

Jaret Goes to the Movies 
In October 2015, Reddick started a podcast with family friend, Rich Coleman, called Jaret Goes to the Movies where they discuss a popular movie from their past each week.  The show's cast has now been expanded to include Reddick's wife, Casey, Eric Dillow, Amy Pittsinger and Sean Timothy (producer).

Jaret Ray Reddick 
In March 2022, Reddick released his debut country album, titled Just Woke Up.

Discography

Solo
 Just Woke Up (2022)

Bowling for Soup

Bowling for Soup (1994)
Cell Mates (1996)
Rock on Honorable Ones!! (1997)
Tell Me When to Whoa (1998)
Let's Do It for Johnny!! (2000)
Drunk Enough to Dance (2002)
A Hangover You Don't Deserve (2004)
Bowling for Soup Goes to the Movies (2005)
The Great Burrito Extortion Case (2006)
Sorry for Partyin' (2009)
Fishin' for Woos (2011)
Lunch. Drunk. Love. (2013)
Songs People Actually Liked (Vol 1) (2015)
Drunk Dynasty (2016)
Pop Drunk Snot Bread (2022)

Phineas and Ferb and Love Händel

Jarinus
 Rhymes with Vaginus (2013)

Demo recordings released
 "18395" – 1:05
 "!@#$%" (Clean Version) – 1:14
 "The Day After Valentine's Day" – 1:40
 "Don't Be a Jerk" – 1:32
 "DVB" – 2:17
 "Farting at Staples" – 1:05
 "Happy Holidays Asshole" – 0:36
 "Happy New Year Asshole" – 1:12
 "It's Parry Gripp's Birthday!" – 0:38
 "Jarinus Kickstarter Theme" – 0:42
 "Jarinus Rhymes with Vaginus" – 1:30
 "Tweet for a Track" – 1:56

People on Vacation
 The Carry On EP (2011)
 The Summer and the Fall (2012)
 Holiday Vacation (2012)
 The Chronicles of Tim Powers (2015)

Other work

Filmography

References

External links
Official Bowling for Soup website
Official Reddick website
Jaret Goes to the Movies website

Living people
American punk rock singers
Punk rock singers
Pop punk singers
American rock guitarists
Rhythm guitarists
American male guitarists
Singers from Texas
People from Wichita Falls, Texas
Guitarists from Texas
Walt Disney Records artists
21st-century American singers
21st-century American guitarists
21st-century American male singers
Year of birth missing (living people)